John Hubbard Beecher, also known as Little John Beecher (8 February 1927, Marshalltown, Iowa – 6 August 1987, Muscogee County, Georgia) was an American bandleader, jazz trumpeter and valve trombonist, and a singer of novelty songs. His band, Little John Beecher and his Orchestra, was active throughout the 1950s, and was booked by National Orchestra Service of Omaha, Nebraska. Before forming his own band, he played trumpet with Lee Williams.

Bands
 Lee Williams Orchestra
 Little John Beecher and His Orchestra — Beecher founded and served as its bandleader throughout the 1950s.  The orchestra was a nonet plus a featured vocalist territory band.  Beecher was a large man, weighing 300 pounds in 1955.  He promoted the catchphrase "THE BAND with the big front." Beecher booked his gigs through the National Orchestra Service ("NOS"), a territory band agency based out of Omaha, Nebraska.  Royce Stoenner, who had been an executive at NOS, left the agency in 1959 to become a partner with the Dave Brumitt Agency, a territory band booking agency in Atlanta.  John Beecher followed Stoenner to Georgia and started working through his agency there.  Shortly thereafter in 1959, the band ended.
 The Cavaliers Orchestra — Jimmy Fuller founded this group in 1946 and served as bandleader until 1976.  Having played trumpet with the Cavaliers since 1973, John Beecher became its second bandleader in the spring of 1976. The Orchestra, based in Columbus, Georgia, is still in existence today.

Original compositions 
 "Mischa Fischa," by Dirk Fischer, nonet, cool jazz, up-tempo (1958) (originally composed by Fischer for the Little John Beecher Orchestra)
 Cinoton, by Dirk Fischer nonet (1959) (originally composed by Fischer for the Little John Beecher Orchestra)

 "Mischa Fischa" and "Cinoton" were recorded for the album Coming of Age by the Dirk Fischer and George Stone Orchestra on Seabreeze Records (2011).

Former members of John Beecher's Orchestra 
 1959–1960: Travis Wayne Jenkins, tenor sax (23 May 1939 Hockley County, Texas – 11 Jan 2004 Bangkok, Thailand)
 1950s: Betty Jordan, vocals ("Jordan" was a stage name), aka Betty Hanson (married to Don Hanson)
 Stewart "Dirk" Fischer
 Richard "Dick" Vaughn Busey, tenor sax (born 1931)
 Russ Long, piano (né Russell V. Longstreth 9 Mar 1939 – 31 Dec 2006)
 Robert Fisher
 Mel (Oscar) Ross, sax
 Carl Greene, horn
 Johnny Morre
 Larry Brown
 Robert Hampson, baritone sax
 1954: Bill Porter, drums
 1958 Don Farrar, Bass

See also
 List of jazz arrangers
 Territory bands

References

External links
Territory Bands Data Base, in memorial of Murray L. Pfeffer (1926–2008)
 Website maintained by Thomas Meyer, Roubaix, France

American jazz trumpeters
American male trumpeters
Swing trumpeters
American jazz composers
American male jazz composers
American music arrangers
Jazz arrangers
American jazz bandleaders
1927 births
1987 deaths
People from Marshalltown, Iowa
20th-century American composers
20th-century trumpeters
Jazz musicians from Nebraska
20th-century American male musicians
20th-century jazz composers